Edmund Tobin Asselin (September 26, 1920 – March 24, 1999) was a Canadian politician, administrator and businessman. He was elected to the House of Commons of Canada in the 1962 election as a Member of the Liberal Party representing the riding of Notre-Dame-de-Grâce. He was re-elected in 1963.

External links 
 

1920 births
1999 deaths
Liberal Party of Canada MPs
Members of the House of Commons of Canada from Quebec
People from Sherbrooke